Gary Williams (born 14 May 1959) is an English former professional footballer.

Career

Blackpool
Williams signed for Alan Ball's Blackpool in the summer of 1980. He started the first 26 League games of the 1980–81 season, before falling out of the team in favour of Terry Pashley.

Allan Brown succeeded Ball in March, with Blackpool heading for relegation, and Brown eventually sold Williams to Swindon Town.

Tranmere Rovers
Whilst in his second spell at Tranmere Rovers, he scored the goal that kept Tranmere in the Football League.
In a 1–0 win against Exeter City, 8 May 1987, the last game of the 1986/87 season, a headed goal in the 84th minute from an Ian Muir cross in front of Tranmere's biggest home crowd for many years (6,983),
thus ensuring Tranmere's survival against relegation into the then GM Vauxhall Conference, a fate which was to land on Lincoln City.

References

External links
 
 Swindon Town profile

Living people
1959 births
English footballers
Tranmere Rovers F.C. players
Blackpool F.C. players
Swindon Town F.C. players
Morecambe F.C. players
English Football League players
Djurgårdens IF Fotboll players
Allsvenskan players
English expatriate footballers
Expatriate footballers in Sweden
Association football defenders
Sportspeople from Birkenhead